New England is a region of north-eastern United States, comprising Connecticut, Maine, Massachusetts, Rhode Island, New Hampshire, and Vermont.

New England may also refer to:

Places

America
 New England Colonies of British America that eventually became five of the six states in New England
 Dominion of New England in America (1686–89) 
 New England, Georgia
 New England, North Dakota
 New England, Ohio
 New England, West Virginia

United Kingdom
 New England, Peterborough, an area of Peterborough, Cambridgeshire, England
 New England Island, an uninhabited island in Essex, England
 New England Quarter, Brighton and Hove, East Sussex, England

Elsewhere
 New England (New South Wales), a region of Australia
 Division of New England, an electoral district
 New England (medieval), on the north coast of the Black Sea, said to have been colonised by 11th century English refugees
 Nieuw Engeland, Rotterdam, Netherlands

Arts and entertainment

Music
 New England (band), an American rock band
 New England (New England album), 1978
 New England (Wishbone Ash album), 1976
 "A New England", a 1983 song by Billy Bragg, covered by Kirsty MacColl and others

Literature
 New England, an imagined region in Nine Nations of North America by Joel Garreau
 Republic of New England, a fictional location in The Alteration by Kingsley Amis

Universities
 University of New England (Australia)
 University of New England (United States)
 New England College, New Hampshire, U.S.

Other uses
, several ships of the U.S. Navy
, several non-naval ships

See also
 
 
 New Englander (disambiguation)
 England (disambiguation)
 Old England (disambiguation)